I'm Losing You is a 1996 novel by the American novelist, screenwriter and director Bruce Wagner. Wagner adapted his novel for, and directed, a 1998 film of the same title, starring Frank Langella and Daniel von Bargen. The film adaption grossed $12,688 in limited release.

External links

1996 American novels
Novels by Bruce Wagner
American novels adapted into films
Hollywood novels